The Big Sandy River (also called Big Sandy Creek) is a  tributary of the Green River in Wyoming in the United States.

Course
It rises in eastern Sublette County, on the west side of the continental divide in the southern Wind River Range, in the Bridger Wilderness Area of the Bridger-Teton National Forest.

It flows south, southwest, southeast, then southwest, past the town of Farson and joins the Green in western Sweetwater County.

Above Farson, it is dammed to form the Big Sandy Reservoir.

See also
 
 List of Wyoming rivers
 List of tributaries of the Colorado River

References

External links
 

Rivers of Wyoming
Tributaries of the Green River (Colorado River tributary)
Tributaries of the Colorado River in Wyoming
Rivers of Sublette County, Wyoming
Rivers of Sweetwater County, Wyoming
Bridger–Teton National Forest